Thorpe is a village and civil parish in the English county of Derbyshire; it is on the Derbyshire/Staffordshire border, on the east bank of the River Dove, about four miles north of Ashbourne. The population of the civil parish as at the 2011 census was 183.

Thorpe is at the southern end of the Peak District National Park almost at the foot of Thorpe Cloud, and is used by some visitors as a base for exploring Dovedale and the Manifold Valley. The Limestone Way long-distance bridleway passes through Thorpe, as does the Peak District Boundary Walk.

The Dovedale Dash, a 4¾ mile cross-country running race held annually each November, was first organised here in 1953.

It formerly had a railway station, Thorpe Cloud railway station, served by the LNWR Ashbourne to Buxton branch line, which linked with the Cromford and High Peak Railway at Parsley Hay.  This former trackbed now forms the long distance Tissington Trail cycle and footpath trail.  There is a small car park at the station site, and some walkers/cyclists leave the trail at this point to visit Dovedale or the nearby village of Ilam.

See also
Listed buildings in Thorpe, Derbyshire

References

External links

Villages in Derbyshire
Towns and villages of the Peak District
Civil parishes in Derbyshire
Derbyshire Dales